The 1996–97 South Pacific cyclone season was one of the most active and longest South Pacific tropical cyclone seasons on record, with 12 tropical cyclones occurring within the South Pacific basin between 160°E and 120°W. The season officially ran from November 1, 1996 - April 30, 1997, however, the season ended later than normal with three systems monitored after the official end of the season. After the season had ended 4 tropical cyclone names were retired from the naming lists, after the cyclones had caused significant impacts to South Pacific islands.

During the season, tropical cyclones were officially monitored by the Regional Specialized Meteorological Center (RSMC) in Nadi, Fiji and the Tropical Cyclone Warning Centers in Brisbane, Australia and Wellington, New Zealand. The United States Armed Forces through the Joint Typhoon Warning Center (JTWC) and Naval Pacific Meteorology and Oceanography Center (NPMOC), also monitored the basin and issued unofficial warnings for American interests. During the season RSMC Nadi issued warnings and assigned names to any tropical cyclones that developed between the Equator and 25°S while TCWC Wellington issued warnings for any that were located to the south of 25°S. The JTWC issued warnings for American interests on any significant tropical cyclone that was located between 160°E and the 180° while the NPMOC issued warnings for tropical cyclones forming between 180° and the American coast. RSMC Nadi and TCWC Wellington measure sustained windspeeds over a 10-minute and used the Australian tropical cyclone intensity scale, while the JTWC and the NPMOC measured sustained windspeeds over a 1-minute period which are compared to the Saffir-Simpson Hurricane Wind Scale (SSHWS).


Season summary 

Ahead of the cyclone season starting on November 1, 1996, the weak to moderate La Nina episode that had caused tropical cyclone activity, to be generally confined to the Coral Sea during the previous season persisted. However, during the season the La Nina episode started to break down, with signs emerging that the El Nino Episode of 1997-98 was starting to develop. These signs included tropical cyclones occurring to the east of 165°E and the South Pacific Convergence Zone becoming more active. The season officially featured a total of eleven tropical cyclones occurring in RSMC Nadi's area of responsibility to the north of 25S, while one developed in TCWC Wellington's area of responsibility and could not be named. An additional system was monitored by the United States Joint Typhoon Warning Center, which was an unofficial warning centre for the region, along with the Naval Pacific Meteorology and Oceanography Center during the season.

Significant tropical cyclones during the season included Fergus and Drena, which both impacted the island nations of Vanuatu, New Caledonia and New Zealand. Severe Tropical Cyclone Gavin was the strongest tropical cyclone and impacted the island nations of Tuvalu, Fiji, New Zealand, Wallis and Futuna. Severe Tropical Cyclone Hina subsequently became the worst tropical cyclone to affect the South Pacific island nation of Tonga since Cyclone Isaac in 1982. Three tropical cyclones developed after the season ended on April 30, including Severe Tropical Cyclone Keli which became the first recorded post-season tropical cyclone to form in June within the South Pacific Ocean. The names Drena, Fergus, Gavin, Hina and Keli were subsequently retired, by the World Meteorological Organization's RA V Tropical Cyclone Committee.

Systems

Tropical Cyclone Cyril 

The storm produced heavy rains and high winds over New Caledonia before dissipating.

Severe Tropical Cyclone Fergus 

Fergus was a Category 2 storm that formed in the Pacific Ocean, lasting from 29 December to 31 December 1996 until becoming extratropical near New Zealand. The storm dropped heavy rainfall across an already saturated area, with totals of over 16.5 inches (425 mm) near Thames. The rainfall led to widespread flooding and forced many to evacuate. Severe road damage occurred, with some roads remaining closed for over a week. Gusty winds from Fergus downed trees and power lines, and caused property damage. Cyclone Fergus brought torrential rain and damaging winds to parts of the North Island of New Zealand. There was no loss of life, in part because of timely warnings about the ferocity of the storm. Damages from the storm were at least $2 million.

Severe Tropical Cyclone Drena 

On January 8, the weakening Cyclone Drena brushed the island of New Caledonia with sustained winds up to 150 km/h (90 mph 10-minute winds). La Foa also recorded  of rain. Wind gusts reached 165 km/h (105 mph) in Koumac. Flooding from the storm caused a total loss of crops and the high winds knocked out power and communication to most of the island.

Severe Tropical Cyclone Evan 

Severe Tropical Cyclone Evan formed on January 10 and dissipated on January 16. Evan stayed northeast of New Zealand for its entire lifetime. Sustained winds peaked at 120 km/h (75 mph).

Tropical Cyclone Freda 

Tropical Cyclone Freda existed from January 26 to February 2.

Tropical Cyclone Harold 

The storm produced large swells along west-facing coasts of New Caledonia.

Tropical Cyclone 29P 

During that day the system continued to develop further as it moved towards the southwest and out of RSMC Nadi's area of responsibility during February 25. As it moved into TCWC Wellington's area of responsibility, the system developed into a category one tropical cyclone, but it was not named as it had developed into a tropical cyclone within the subtropics.

After developing into a tropical cyclone the cyclone continued to intensify and develop further, before TCWC Wellington reported early on February 26 that the system had become a category 2 tropical cyclone. The NPMOC subsequently started to issue warnings on the system and designated it as Tropical Cyclone 29P, while the cyclone was near its peak 1-minute sustained windspeeds of 85 km/h (50 mph). Later that day after it had peaked, the cyclone started to transition into an extratropical cyclone, before the NPMOC issued its final advisory on the system during the next day as it weakened below tropical cyclone intensity. The cyclone's remnants were subsequently last noted by TCWC Wellington during March 2, as it affected parts of New Zealand and caused flooding in Whangarei.

Severe Tropical Cyclone Gavin 

Damages from the storm in Fiji amounted to $27 million. Seven people were killed and 18 others were listed as missing due to Cyclone Gavin.

Severe Tropical Cyclone Hina 

On March 11, the FMS started to monitor a shallow depression, that had developed along the monsoon trough near Rotuma. Over the next two days the depression remained near Rotuma with no preferred movement, as it started to develop further within favourable conditions for further development. During March 13, the JTWC subsequently initiated advisories on the system and designated it as Tropical Cyclone 33P. Early on March 15, after the system had passed near Niulakita, the FMS reported that the depression had developed into a category 1 tropical cyclone and named it Hina. After being named the system accelerated towards the south-southeast and an area of increasing vertical wind shear, as it passed near the west coast of Futuna Island. The system also crossed the 180th meridian during that day, which prompted the JTWC to pass the responsibility for warning the United States Government to the NPMOC.

Hina subsequently passed over the islands of Tongatapu and ʻEua in southern Tonga at around 0830 UTC and took less than 2 hours to inflict considerable damage on the islands. After impacting Tonga the system moved rapidly towards the south-southeast and weakened below tropical cyclone intensity, before it was last noted on March 21, to the south of the Pitcairn Islands. During the systems post analysis it was determined that the warning centers had underestimated Hina's intensity as it passed over Tonga, after damage had been greater than expected in the island nation. the FMS subsequently deduced that Hina was a minimal category 3 severe tropical cyclone, with peak 10-minute sustained wind speeds of  when it impacted Tonga.

Cyclone Hina caused widespread damage in Tonga, leaving roughly $14.5 million in damages. About 320 families were left homeless after the storm.

Tropical Cyclone Ian 

On April 13, RSMC Nadi started to monitor a depression that had developed to the east of the Santa Cruz Islands. Over the next few days the depression slowly developed further before early on April 17 RSMC Nadi reported that the depression had become a category one tropical cyclone and named it Ian.

Tropical Cyclone June 

On April 30, RSMC Nadi started to monitor a weak area of low pressure that had developed to the northwest of the Fijian dependency of Rotuma. Over the next couple of days, the system remained poorly organised under the influence of vertical wind shear, from the northwest as it moved slowly towards the south-southwest. During May 2, subsequently initiated advisories on the system and designated it as Tropical Cyclone 35P, after the vertical wind shear surrounding the system, had relaxed and good outflow had developed aloft. During that day the system started to move towards the south-southeast and rapidly developed before RSMC Nadi reported later that day, that the system had developed into a category 1 tropical cyclone and named it June. During May 3, the system continued to develop further and became slow moving, before it started to appear on radar imagery later that day. RSMC Nadi subsequently reported early the next day that the system had peaked as a category 2 tropical cyclone, with 10-minute sustained wind speeds of 95 km/h (60 mph). Later that day the JTWC reported that the system had peaked with 1-minute sustained wind speeds of 120 km/h (75 mph), which made June equivalent to a category 1 hurricane on the SSHWS.

Severe flooding produced by the storm in Fiji left roughly $500,000 in damages.

Severe Tropical Cyclone Keli 

On June 10, RSMC Nadi reported that a tropical cyclone had developed near Tuvalu, out of a tropical depression that had existed since June 7, and named it Keli.

Other systems 
On February 18, a tropical depression formed to the northeast of Fiji and moved southwestwards, before it was last noted during the next day. During May 26, the JTWC started monitoring a tropical disturbance that had developed to the southeast of the Solomon Islands, in response to strong westerly winds along the equator. Over the next two days the disturbance gradually developed further, before the JTWC initiated advisories on the system and designated it as Tropical Cyclone 37P during May 28. During May 30, the system dissipated as a significant tropical cyclone, after it had encountered cooler waters and stronger vertical windshear.

Season effects 
This table lists all the storms that developed in the South Pacific basin, to the east of 160E during the 1996–97 season. It includes their intensity on the Australian tropical cyclone intensity scale, duration, name, areas affected, deaths, and damages. For most storms the data is taken from TCWC Nadi and Wellingtons archives, however data for 37P has been taken from the JTWC archives rather than RSMC Nadi and TCWC Wellington's archives, and thus the winds are a period of 1-minute sustained as opposed to 10-minutes.

Notes

See also 

 List of Southern Hemisphere tropical cyclone seasons
 Atlantic hurricane seasons: 1996, 1997
 Pacific hurricane seasons: 1996, 1997
 Pacific typhoon seasons: 1996, 1997
 North Indian Ocean cyclone seasons: 1996, 1997

References

External links 

 
South Pacific cyclone seasons
Articles which contain graphical timelines